A banshee (Modern Irish , from  , "woman of the fairy mound" or "fairy woman") is a female spirit in Irish folklore who heralds the death of a family member, usually by screaming, wailing, shrieking, or keening.

Description
Sometimes she has long streaming hair and wears a grey cloak over a green dress, and her eyes are red from continual weeping. She may be dressed in white with red hair and a ghastly complexion, according to a firsthand account by Ann, Lady Fanshawe in her Memoirs. Lady Wilde in her books provides others:

In John O'Brien's Irish-English dictionary, the entry for Síth-Bhróg states:"hence bean-síghe, plural mná-síghe, she-fairies or women-fairies, credulously supposed by the common people to be so affected to certain families that they are heard to sing mournful lamentations about their houses by night, whenever any of the family labours under a sickness which is to end by death, but no families which are not of an ancient & noble Stock, are believed to be honoured with this fairy privilege".

Keening

This keening woman may in some cases be a professional, and the best keeners would be in high demand.

Irish legend speaks of a lament being sung by a fairy woman, or banshee. She would sing it when a family member died or was about to die, even if the person had died far away and news of their death had not yet come. In those cases, her wailing would be the first warning the household had of the death.

The banshee also is a predictor of death. If someone is about to enter a situation where it is unlikely they will come out alive she will warn people by screaming or wailing, giving rise to a banshee also being known as a wailing woman.

It is often stated that the banshee laments only the descendants of the pure Milesian stock of Ireland, sometimes clarified as surnames prefixed with O' and Mac, and some accounts even state that each family has its own banshee. One account, however, also included the Geraldines, as they had apparently become "more Irish than the Irish themselves," countering the lore ascribing banshees exclusively to those of Milesian stock. Other exceptions were the Bunworth Banshee, which heralded the death of the Rev. Charles Bunworth, a name of Anglo-Saxon origin, and the Rossmore banshee, which supposedly heralded the death of a member of the family of Baron Rossmore, whose ancestry was predominantly Scottish and Dutch.

When several banshees appear at once, it indicates the death of someone great or holy. The tales sometimes recounted that the woman, though called a fairy, was a ghost, often of a specific murdered woman, or a mother who died in childbirth.

Origin
Most, though not all, surnames associated with banshees have the Ó or Mc/Mac prefix – that is, surnames of Goidelic origin, indicating a family native to the Insular Celtic lands rather than those of the Norse, Anglo-Saxon, or Norman. Accounts reach as far back as 1380 to the publication of the Cathreim Thoirdhealbhaigh (Triumphs of Torlough) by Sean mac Craith. Mentions of banshees can also be found in Norman literature of that time.

The Ua Briain banshee is thought to be named Aibell and the ruler of 25 other banshees who would always be at her attendance. It is possible that this particular story is the source of the idea that the wailing of numerous banshees signifies the death of a great person.

In some parts of Leinster, she is referred to as the bean chaointe (keening woman) whose wail can be so piercing that it shatters glass. In Scottish folklore, a similar creature is known as the bean nighe or ban nigheachain (little washerwoman) or nigheag na h-àth (little washer at the ford) and is seen washing the bloodstained clothes or armour of those who are about to die. In Welsh folklore, a similar creature is known as the cyhyraeth.

In popular culture

Banshees, or creatures based upon them, have appeared in many forms in popular culture.

See also

Baobhan Sith
Cailleach
Caoineag
Clíodhna
La Llorona
Madam Koi Koi
Psychopomp
Siren
White Lady (ghost)
Devil Bird, a similar omen in Sri lankan folklore

References

Further reading

External links
 
 
 

 
Aos Sí
Fairies
Fantasy creatures
Female legendary creatures
Irish folklore
Irish ghosts
Irish legendary creatures
Personifications of death
Psychopomps
Supernatural legends
Tuatha Dé Danann